Our Willi Is the Best is a 1971 German comedy film directed by Werner Jacobs and starring Heinz Erhardt, Ruth Stephan and Rudolf Schündler. Now retired from his civil service job, Willi becomes a door-to-door salesman. Is the third part of the 'Willi' series of films.

Cast
 Heinz Erhardt as Willi Winzig
 Ruth Stephan as Heidelinde Hansen
 Rudolf Schündler as Ottokar Mümmelmann
 Elsa Wagner as Alte Dame
 Paul Esser as Herr Kaiser
 Jutta Speidel as Biggi Hansen
 Henry Vahl as Opa Hansen
 Martin Hirthe as Hauswirt Graumann
 Edith Hancke as Elsetraut Knöpfke
 Hans Terofal as Emil Klingelberg
 Martin Jente as Butler Edu
 Wolfgang Völz as Rolls-Royce Chauffeur

References

External links

1971 films
1971 comedy films
German comedy films
West German films
1970s German-language films
Films set in Berlin
Films directed by Werner Jacobs
Constantin Film films
1970s German films